Racing Gears Advance is a combat racing game for the Game Boy Advance system released in 2004 and includes licensed vehicles from GM, Dodge, Mitsubishi and Lotus Cars.

The soundtrack is notable for having been composed by Neil Voss, known for his prior work on Tetrisphere and The New Tetris.

All circuit cups (there are five total) take the name of letters from the Greek alphabet (Alpha, Gamma, Delta, Epsilon, Omega), with each cup having five tracks (25 tracks total).

Characters such as Spacewave, Jack Speed, Throttle, etc., drive the following cars:

Cadillac Escalade
Chevrolet Corvette
Chevrolet SSR
Dodge Viper
Dodge Magnum
Hummer H2
Lotus Esprit
Lotus Exige
Lotus Elise
Lotus 340R
Mitsubishi Lancer

Due to its success, a sequel was announced for Nintendo DS under the working title Racing Gears DS, but was later cancelled.

Reception

Racing Gears Advance received positive reviews from critics. On Metacritic, the game holds a score of 83/100 based on 17 reviews.

Alex Navarro of GameSpot gave the game 8.5/10 while praising its controls, vehicle upgrades, and multiplayer. Craig Harris of IGN was similarly positive towards the game, giving it 8.9/10 and praising almost everything about the game except for its inability to save records for the player's best lap and race times.

References

2004 video games
Game Boy Advance games
Game Boy Advance-only games
Racing video games
Video games developed in Canada
Video games scored by Neil Voss
Multiplayer and single-player video games